Best of Scotch is a compilation album by the Italian Italo disco band Scotch. Released in Germany in November 1992, it features hit singles and other songs issued by the group between 1983 and 1987.

Track listing

Charts

References

External links 

 

1992 greatest hits albums
Scotch (band) albums